Lesbury railway station served the village of Lesbury, Northumberland, England from 1847 to 1850 on the East Coast Main Line.

History 
The station was opened on 1 July 1847 by the Newcastle and Berwick Railway. The station was situated 400 yards along a track that ran north from the Alnwick–Warkworth road, now the A1068. The station was very short-lived and closed, after 3 years, on 1 October 1850, due to the opening of Bilton station, now known as Alnmouth station. The site was converted into two houses for railway workers.

References

External links 

Disused railway stations in Northumberland
Former North Eastern Railway (UK) stations
Railway stations in Great Britain opened in 1847
Railway stations in Great Britain closed in 1850
1847 establishments in England
1850 disestablishments in England